The NBA 60 Greatest Playoff Moments were chosen in 2006 to honor the sixtieth anniversary of the founding of the National Basketball Association (NBA). These 60 moments (in total, there were sixty-two moments; the last three were deemed tied) were selected through a vote by a 25-member panel of experts made up by media members and former players. The last 50 moments (from the eleventh to the sixtieth) were ranked by the panel. The top 10 moments were instead ranked by fans who voted online. The voting ended on June 5, 2006 and the results were announced in a television special aired on NBA TV the following day.

As the name suggested, all of these moments happened during the NBA playoffs. Forty moments selected happened in the Finals round, with 19 of them happening during the 1980s and 18 of them happening during the 1990s.

List

Numbers of moments by decades

Voters

References

External links
NBA.com: The 60 Greatest Playoff Moments
NBA TV Unveils the Top 10 Greatest Playoff Moments in NBA History, June 1, 2006
Fans pick '98 Jordan shot as greatest playoff moment, June 7, 2006

National Basketball Association lists
National Basketball Association playoffs